Ulvales is an order of green algae.

References

External links
 
 

 
Chlorophyta orders